Kojonup is a town  south-east of Perth, Western Australia along Albany Highway in the Great Southern region. The name Kojonup refers to the "Kodja" or stone axe made by Aboriginal Australians, from the local stone.

History
The Noongar people are the traditional owners and inhabitants of Kojonup. Specifically, the Noongar people of Kojonup today are descendants of the Kaneang language group and their neighbours, such as the Koreng, Pinjareb and Menang. Historically the Noongar people drank from the local freshwater spring and hunted game with the traditional Noongar "kodj", or stone axe. Both Kojonup and The Kodja Place are named after the historically significant implement.

The first European in the area was surveyor Alfred Hillman who arrived in 1837 and had been guided to freshwater spring by the Noongar people. The site was an important staging place on the road to Albany, and in 1837 a military post was established there for the protection of travellers and the mail. By 1845 this outpost had grown to support a military barracks, built on the site of the freshwater spring. Today, the barracks still stands on its original site and houses the Kojonup Pioneer Museum. The barracks is one of the oldest buildings in Western Australia. The first farms in Kojonup were set up by soldiers with settlement grants. The appointment in 1865 of a mounted police constable marked the phasing out of the military presence at Kojonup. By the late 1860s the military had left and the barracks became a focus for community gatherings, much as it is today. The town's first police station was built in 1869 and the first hotel licence was granted in 1868.

In early 1898 the population of the town was 67, 32 men and 35 women.

In 1926 the Kojonup Memorial Hall was built at a cost of £5,000; it was officially opened by Major General Sir Talbot Hobbs.

Kojonup has been the home to many important Australian rules football players, including several players of Indigenous Australian descent.

Economy

The early economy of the town was initially dependent on cutting and transporting sandalwood and kangaroo hunting but by the mid-19th century the wool industry began to boom and by 1906 the shire had 10,500 sheep. By 1989 the shire had seen over 1 million sheep being shorn.

To celebrate the importance of the wool industry the town built a one and a half scale model of a wool wagon; the project was officially opened on Australia Day in 2001.

The surrounding areas produce wheat and other cereal crops including organic, conventional and genetically modified.

The Kojonup region has hosted some of Australia's earliest biodynamic and organic agriculture endeavours. The Marsh v Baxter case has put Kojonup at the epicentre of the battle in Australia of organic versus genetically modified agriculture. The town is a receival site for Cooperative Bulk Handling.

Recreation

Sporting facilities include a golf club with 18 holes, a tennis club, a skate park, a  outdoor swimming pool, football oval, netball courts, and hockey ovals. Other attractions are The Kodja Place, Kojonup Youth Centre and rose maze. Town elder, Billy Riley, gives tours at The Kodja Place, recognising the Noongar history of Kojonup. The name of the Jack Cox courtyard commemorates the life of the first Noongar guide at Kodja Place.

Notable current and past residents 
Peter Bell, Australian rules football player, member of the Australian Football Hall of Fame
Shannon Cox, Australian rules football player
Stephen Michael, Australian rules football player, member of the Australian Football Hall of Fame
Brigadier Arnold William Potts DSO, OBE, MC, MID), Australian grazier who served in both World Wars

Climate

See also
 Kojonup Reserve

References

External links
 Shire of Kojonup

Towns in Western Australia
Great Southern (Western Australia)
Grain receival points of Western Australia